Septwolves may refer to:

Septwolves (clothing), Chinese clothing company
Septwolves (tobacco), Chinese tobacco brand